Martin's Mills is an unincorporated community located in Wayne County, Tennessee.  There is one church in Martin's Mills which is Martin's Mills Church of Christ.  The Rose Normal Academy and Martin's Mills School formerly operated at Martin's Mills.

Cemeteries
Davanna Cemetery
Eaton Cemetery
Herndon Cemetery
Rose Cemetery
Horton Cemetery
Sinclair Cemetery

Nearby cities and communities
Lutts
Houston
Olivehill
Collinwood

References

External links
 History of Martin's Mills/Lutts Baptist Church
 History of Martin's Mills

Unincorporated communities in Wayne County, Tennessee
Unincorporated communities in Tennessee